Zuidbroek is a hamlet in the Dutch province of South Holland. It is located about 8 km south of the city of Gouda, in the municipality of Bergambacht.

Zuidbroek was a separate municipality between 1817 and 1857, when it became part of Bergambacht.

References

Populated places in South Holland
Former municipalities of South Holland
1817 establishments in the Netherlands